Raphitoma kharybdis is a species of sea snail, a marine gastropod mollusk in the family Raphitomidae.

Description
The length of the shell attains 8.4 mm. The protoconch is paucispiral.

Distribution
This marine species occurs in the Mediterranean Sea off Sicily, Italy

References
Bibliography
 Giannuzzi-Savelli R., Pusateri F. & Bartolini S. (2018). A revision of the Mediterranean Raphitomidae (Gastropoda: Conoidea) 5: loss of planktotrophy and pairs of species, with the description of four new species. Bollettino Malacologico. 54, supplement 11: 1-77. page(s): 35-36, figs 38-39B

Notes

External links
 Biolib.cz: Raphitoma kharybdis

kharybdis
Gastropods described in 2018